

See also
 List of demolished churches in the City of London
 Great Fire of London
 List of Christopher Wren Churches in London

General:
 List of demolished buildings and structures in London

References

Bibliography

 
London religion-related lists
Lists of demolished buildings and structures
Lists of buildings and structures in London
London, Churches destroyed in the Great Fire
Lists of religious buildings and structures in London